is a Japanese voice actress, YouTuber, tarento and singer from Sapporo who is affiliated with Quatre Stella. She is known for her role as Koguma, the protagonist of the anime television series Super Cub.

Biography
Yomichi was born in Sapporo on November 21, 1999. When she was in her third year of junior high school, she was scouted by a talent agency and began entertainment activities. In 2020, she began serving as an ambassador for Sony's Xperia line of phones.

In 2021, she was cast in her first main voice acting role as Koguma, the protagonist of the anime television series Super Cub. She has also been cast as Serene Hozumi in the anime series Mother of the Goddess' Dormitory.

She made her singer debut on May 10, 2022 with her mini-album debut  on July 20, 2022.

Filmography

Anime
Sono Toki, Kanojo wa. (2018), Chiaki
Super Cub (2021), Koguma
Mother of the Goddess' Dormitory (2021), Serene Hozumi
Ippon Again! (2023), Sachi Minato
Rokudō no Onna-tachi (2023), Azami Himeno

Video games
 Samurai Maiden (2022), Tsumugi Tamaori

References

External links
Agency profile  
YouTube channel

  

1999 births
Japanese voice actresses
Japanese YouTubers
Living people
Voice actresses from Hokkaido
Japanese women pop singers
21st-century Japanese actresses
21st-century Japanese singers
21st-century Japanese women singers